is a sub-kilometer near-Earth asteroid of the Aten group, discovered by the Siding Spring Survey at Siding Spring Observatory, Australia on 18 September 2009. It is in a co-orbital configuration with Earth, a type of 1:1 orbital resonance where the asteroid appears to librate around Earth's path in a horseshoe orbit when viewed in a corotating reference frame with Earth.

Discovery 
 was discovered by the Siding Spring Survey at Siding Spring Observatory, Coonabarabran, New South Wales, Australia on 18 September 2009. It was first observed in the constellation Fornax at an apparent magnitude of 18.8. Follow-up observations of the asteroid were carried out by the Rio Cuarto Observatory  on the following day.

Orbit 

 orbits the Sun at an average distance of 0.99 AU once every 360 days, or approximately 0.99 years. Its orbit has an eccentricity of 0.09 and an inclination of 7° with respect to the ecliptic plane. Over the course of its orbit, its distance from the Sun ranges from 0.90 AU at perihelion to 1.08 AU at aphelion, crossing the orbit of Earth. Since its orbit crosses that of Earth's while having a semi-major axis less than 1 AU,  is classified as an Aten asteroid.

In 2013, astronomers Carlos and Raúl de la Fuente Marcos identified  to be in a co-orbital configuration with Earth, a type of 1:1 orbital resonance where the asteroid appears to librate around Earth's path in a horseshoe orbit when viewed in a corotating reference frame with Earth.

Physical characteristics 
Based on an magnitude-to-diameter conversion and a measured absolute magnitude of 24.9,  measures between 30 and 60 meters in diameter for an assumed geometric albedo of 0.25 and 0.05, respectively. A rotation period of  has been tentatively measured from its lightcurve.

See also 
 Arjuna asteroid

References

External links 
 
 
 

Minor planet object articles (unnumbered)

Earth-crossing asteroids
20090918